This is a list of amphibians of Metropolitan France (European France). For the amphibians of overseas France, see:
List of amphibians of Guadeloupe
List of amphibians of Martinique
List of amphibians of French Guiana
List of amphibians of French Polynesia
List of amphibians of Réunion
List of amphibians of Mayotte

Frogs and toads (Anura)

Ranidae
Rana arvalis, moor frog

Bufonidae
Bufo bufo, common toad

Salamanders (Caudata)

Salamandridae
Lissotriton vulgaris, common newt
Salamandra salamandra, fire salamander

See also
Fauna of Metropolitan France

France
Amphibians
France